Here's to You & I is the fourth studio album by Australian country band The McClymonts, released in Australia on 4 July 2014 by Universal Records and peaking at No. 8. It was their first album that was recorded entirely in Australia.

Track listing
 "Here's To You & I"
 "Going Under (Didn't Have To)"
 "Blood Is Thicker Than Water"
 "Forever Begins Tonight"
 "Better At My Worst"
 "Who Said It"
 "Alone"
 "Heart Breaks"
 "Lifelines & Superheroes"
 "Top Rolled Down"
 "Same Kind"
 "Lay Some Love"

Charts

Weekly charts

Year-end charts

References 

2014 albums
The McClymonts albums
Albums produced by Lindsay Rimes